Mert Öcal (born 29 September 1982) is a Turkish actor and model who won Best Model of Turkey 2004 and went on to win Best Model of the World the same year.

His film and television work include appearances in Asla Unutma (2005), Nehir (2005), Rüyalarda Buluşuruz (2006), Oyun Bitti (2007), Görgüsüzler (2008), Kız Annesi (2011), Rüya Peşinde: Takkeci Baba (2011), Bizim Okul (2013), Mahmut ile Meryem (2013), Aşk Yeniden (2015–2016), and Defne'nin Bir Mevsimi (2016).

Early life
Mert Öcal was born on 29 September 1982 in Istanbul, Turkey. Since the age of 18, he is engaged in a variety of sports and activities, including tennis, volleyball, football, and basketball.

Pageantry

Best Model of Turkey
Mert Öcal competed in the 17th Best Model of Turkey pageant and won the title "Best Model of Turkey 2004".

Best Model of the World
He represented Turkey at the 17th Best Model of the World pageant where he was crowned Best Model of the World 2004, succeeding Best Model of the World 2003 Stefan Alie of France. He became the fourth man from Turkey, after Kenan İmirzalıoğlu (1997), Faik Ergin (1999), and Kıvanç Tatlıtuğ (2002), to win the Best Model of the World title.

Acting career
Mert Öcal has acted in film and television productions, including the 2005 Show TV drama series Asla Unutma (alongside Ediz Hun, Hülya Koçyiğit, and Göksel Arsoy); 2005 Kanal D drama series Nehir; 2006 Show TV mini-series Rüyalarda Buluşuruz (alongside Selda Alkor); 2007 Kanal D comedy drama series Oyun Bitti (alongside Zeki Alasya); 2008 atv comedy series Görgüsüzler; 2011 Kanal 7 drama series Kız Annesi; 2013 atv comedy series Bizim Okul, and the romantic comedy television series Aşk Yeniden that aired on FOX between 2015 and 2016.

Filmography

Film

Television

References

External links
 

1982 births
Best Model of the World winners
Best Model of Turkey winners
Living people
Models from Istanbul
Turkish male film actors
Turkish male models
Turkish male television actors
Survivor Turkey contestants
Male actors from Istanbul